Live Again may refer to:

 Live Again (TV series), a 2007 Singaporean Mandarin-language drama
 Live Again (album), a 2012 live album by Silly Wizard
 Live Again!, a 1997 live album by Israel Vibration
 Live...Again: Live at Montreux, a 1993 live album by Don Pullen and the African-Brazilian Connection
  a 1978 live extended play by REO Speedwagon
 "Live Again" (Sevendust song), 2002
 "Live Again", a song from Better Than Ezra's 1998 album How Does Your Garden Grow?
 "Live Again", a song by Ying Yang Twins featuring Adam Levine from the 2005 album U.S.A. (United State of Atlanta)
 "Live Again (The Fall of Man)", a song from Bad Religion's 2004 album The Empire Strikes First

See also
 I Live Again, a 1936 British film directed by Arthur Maude
 Alive Again (disambiguation)
 To Live Again (disambiguation)